David Winston Pugh Jr. (born July 24, 1979) is a former football player for the Indianapolis Colts. He weighed 270 pounds and stood 6–2.

High school career 
David played  High school football  at Amherst Highschool. He was a guard 9th grade and then play tackle 10th grade and played guard the rest of his Highschool career. On Defence he played defensive tackle all his Highschool career. He got scholarships to Virginia Tech, UCLA, UVA ext.

College career 
David played college football at Virginia Tech. He was ranked 21st in the 2002 Pre-Draft rankings, as ranked by draftcountdown.com. He was mentioned in the 2001 All-American Pre-Season Honors rankings. He wore #71 at Virginia Tech.

Professional career 
David was selected with the 10th pick (182nd overall) of the 6th round of the 2002 NFL Draft by the Indianapolis Colts. As a rookie, he wore #95. In four games, he started one, and finished with one sack in a preseason game against Seattle Seahawks and three tackles against the Washington Redskins. He did not play in the Colts post-season loss to the Jets.

Although he was with the Colts in 2003, he couldn’t play because of a knee injury during the off season.

References

1979 births
Living people
American football defensive tackles
Virginia Tech Hokies football players
Indianapolis Colts players